Ruhenstroth is a census-designated place (CDP) in Douglas County, Nevada, United States. The population was 1,293 at the 2010 census.

Geography

Demographics

References

Census-designated places in Douglas County, Nevada
Census-designated places in Nevada